Harrison Soccer Club, also referred to as Harrison F.C., was an American soccer club founded as the amateur Erie Athletic Association Football Club that played in the National Association Foot Ball League. As Erie A.A., the club was based in Kearny, New Jersey. In 1921, the club changed its name to Harrison S.C. when it became a founding member of the professional American Soccer League and played its home matches at Harrison Field. The team won the New Jersey State Cup in 1920 and 1922.

Year-by-year

Notes and references
Bibliography

Footnotes

National Association Football League teams
Defunct soccer clubs in New Jersey
American Soccer League (1921–1933) teams
Harrison, New Jersey